The electricity sector in Finland relies on nuclear power, renewable energy, cogeneration and electricity import from neighboring countries. Finland has the highest per-capita electricity consumption in the EU. Co-generation of heat and electricity for industry process heat and district heating is common. Finland is one of the last countries in the world still burning peat.

As part of the energy transition Finland has been replacing electricity generation from fossil fuels with nuclear power and renewables. Wind power in particular has grown to be a significant part of electricity generation. A fifth nuclear reactor, Olkiluoto 3 is in final stages of commissioning and once fully operational will increase nuclear power generation by over 50%.

Finland is part of the synchronous grid of Northern Europe.

Consumption and import
Industry was the majority consumer of electricity between 1990 and 2005 with 52-54% of total consumption. The forest industry alone consumed 30-32%.

Between 2000 and 2006, up to 7 TWh per year was imported from Sweden and up to 11.5 TWh from Russia. Net imports during this time varied between 7 TWh to Sweden and 7 TWh from Sweden, and 4 to 11 TWh from Russia. Since 2007, some electricity has also been imported from Estonia.

In 2012, most of the imports were from Sweden (14.4 TWh net import) with Russia also contributing to the net imbalance (4.4 TWh import only), while exports to Estonia were larger than imports (1.1 TWh net export).

 Preliminary data

Capacity

, the total capacity of power generation in Finland is 17.5 GW. However, not all of that is available at the same time and an increasing amount is intermittent generation, mostly from wind power (see below).

The national grid operator Fingrid, together with TSOs from other Nordic countries, produces yearly estimates about the availability of power in the winter demand peak. In 2019-2020 they estimated a peak Finnish demand of 15.3 GW, during which Finland would have 11.9 GW of production capacity, not including capacity reserves. That would have meant a shortfall of 3.4 GW to be imported from neighbors. Due to a mild winter and industrial strikes the actual demand peak was only 12.4 GW and availability was never in question. No capacity reserve was activated.

Mode of production 

 Preliminary data

Fossil fuels 

Except for peat, which is variously classed as either a fossil fuel or a slow-renewable fuel, Finland imports all the fossil fuels used for electricity production. Coal and natural gas account for most of the production, with some oil generators acting mostly as reserve. The use of fossil fuels has fallen from highs over 30% in 2003-2004 to 20% or below in 2012-2014. By 2020 the share was closer to 10%. This is largely a consequence of cheap imported electricity, although domestic renewables have also increased in their share of production.

In 2019 the parliament passed a law to ban the use of coal for energy production by May 1, 2029.  there are no plans to ban other fossil fuels. Despite popular support for banning the use of peat, there is only a commitment to halve its use by 2030. However, it is estimated that market forces will reduce peat's energy use to a third of its 2019 level by 2025.

Nuclear power

Renewable energy 

Between 2005-2014, Finland produced 25-30% of electricity as a percentage of demand from renewable energy. The largest source is hydropower (15-20%) which fluctuates yearly depending on rainfall, causing the share of renewable generation to also vary. Other major sources are wood-based energy resources like black liquor from the forest industry, accounting for approximately 12% on average. In recent years wind power (see below) has grown to be significant and renewables have surpassed 40% of demand.

Wind power

Companies

Production 
Major producers in Finland include: Fortum, Pohjolan Voima, Teollisuuden Voima and Helsingin Energia.

Market 
Nord Pool Spot is the shared power market for Finland and nearby countries.

Transmission 
Fingrid Oyj is a Finnish national electricity transmission grid operator.

Distribution 
Major distributors are: Helen Oy, Caruna and Elenia.

Caruna in the south of Finland is owned mostly (80%) by Australian and Dutch holding and property companies. In 2017 Caruna's turn-over was €145 million and state tax rate 4% (€6 million). In 2017 Caruna paid its stakeholders  8.17% interest (77 million) while market loans were 1.5–3 % interest. Company interest cost were reduced from the taxable income based on Sipilä Cabinet taxation rules.

Politics 
In 2016 there has been renewed discussion about Finland's energy policy. Finland imports over 20% of the electricity used at peak usage. For example, in the hour between 17-18 on January 7, 2016, during a period of extreme cold, Finland imported 4,300 MW (28.5%) out of a record 15,100 MW of total usage (average over 1 hour). The delays in the construction of the third reactor at the Olkiluoto Nuclear Power Plant (est. 1,600 MWe when completed), which was projected to be operating commercially by 2010 but is now being estimated to be completed no earlier than 2022, have caused a significant domestic energy production deficit. A consortium of Finnish industry and power companies called Fennovoima has applied and been granted a permission to build another new nuclear power plant, delivered by Russia's Rosatom, which also has a 1/3 stake on the power plant. This has caused some concern among observers about Russia being able to manipulate Nordic electricity prices or use the power plant as a leverage in conflict situations. The plant was estimated to be operational by 2024 and projected to produce 1,200 MW of electricity, but all work was stopped in 2022 due to the Russian invasion of Ukraine.

The Finnish Security Intelligence Service (Supo) indicated in 2016 that foreign intelligence activity in Finland was aimed at influencing decision-making in energy policy.

See also 
 Energy in Finland
 Nordic energy market
 Economy of Finland

References